Ioannis Palaiokrassas (27 March 1934 – 2 October 2021) was a Greek politician.

He was a Minister for Finance and a European Commissioner in the Delors Commission. On 14 July 1992 Palaiokrassas's car was the objective of a rocket attack in Central Athens. The attack missed its target, but killed a passer-by.

He was the chairman of the board at Logos University College.

On 2 October 2021, Palaiokrassas died at the age of 85.

References

|-

1934 births
2021 deaths
Greek European Commissioners
Finance ministers of Greece
Politicians from Athens
New Democracy (Greece) politicians